St Columba's Church is a Roman Catholic Parish church in Woodside, Glasgow, Scotland. It was completed in 1941 and designed by Gillespie, Kidd & Coia. It is situated on Hopehill Road south west of Garscube Road. From 2005 until 2016 it was served by priests from the Dominican Order. Since 2016 it has been served by the Holy Ghost Fathers. It is a category A listed building.

History
On 26 March 1937, a Fr Denis Flynn applied for permission to build a Catholic church in Woodside, Glasgow. Soon after was the 1938 Empire Exhibition in Scotland. In that exhibition was the Catholic Pavilion, which was designed by Jack Coia. He was commissioned to design St Columba's Church. However, construction was halted during the initial years of World War II. In 1941, permission was granted for construction to continue and the church was completed during the Blitz. The cost of constructing of the church was paid by local congregation. Each local family paid 6d for the bricks used in construction. It was the only church to be completed in Glasgow during World War II.

Architecture
The church design is inspired by the Italian Romanesque style with basilica layout. The front of the church, facing west, has a cross-shaped window. While the exterior is made of brick, it is built over a concrete portal frame and has a mansard roof. Over the central door is a sculpture of the Paschal Lamb over central door. The church's stations of the cross were painted by Hugh Adam Crawford and came from the Catholic Pavilion at the Empire Exhibition, Scotland. In the sanctuary is a marble reredos with a carved crucifix by Benno Schotz.

Parish
In 2005, the Dominican priests began their service to the parish. They remained in the parish until 2016, when they withdrew from area. In their place, the Holy Ghost Fathers arrived and have served until 7 January 2021, when the Blessed Sacrament Fathers took over the administration of the parish. The Holy Ghost Fathers who went to the south side of the city to be near the Queen Elizabeth University Teaching Hospital of which they also serve as chaplains.

There are five Sunday Masses held in the church at 4:00pm on Saturday, 8:30am, 10:00am, 12:00pm and 5:00pm on Sunday. From Monday to Friday there are Masses at 10:00am and 12:30pm.

See also
 Archdiocese of Glasgow

References

External links
 
 St Columba's Parish site

Saint Columba
Listed Roman Catholic churches in Scotland
Roman Catholic churches in Scotland
Roman Catholic churches completed in 1941
1937 establishments in Scotland
Romanesque Revival church buildings in the United Kingdom
Saint Columba
20th-century Roman Catholic church buildings in the United Kingdom
Saint Columba
Dominican churches in the United Kingdom